Aik Sitam Aur is a Pakistani drama series that airs on ARY Digital. It is written by Rehana Aftaab, directed by Ilyas Kashmiri and produced by Six Sigma Plus. It features Usama Khan, Anmol Baloch, Srha Asghar and Maria Wasti in leading roles. The series ended on 26 July 2022.

Cast 
 Usama Khan as Shahroz
 Rubina Ashraf as Naeema (Shahroz's mother)
 Sajid Hasan as Wahab (Shahroz's father)
 Anmol Baloch as Ushna (Zainab and Furqan's adoptive daughter)
 Adnan Jaffar as Furqan (Ushna's father)
 Maria Wasti as Zainab (Ushna's mother)
 Salman Saeed as Sufyan (Raeesa and Rafaqat's son)
 Srha Asghar as Sadaf (Sufyans's sister)
 Shahood Alvi as Rafaqat (Sufyan and Sadaf's father)
 Ayesha Gul as Raeesa (Rafaqat's wife, Sufyan and Sadaf's mother)
 Adnan Jeelani as Shujaat 
 Javeria Abbasi as Mehnaz (Shujaat's wife)
 Fahad Khan as Huzayfa (Mehnaz and Shujaat's son)
 Sabiha Hashmi as Ushna's grandmother
 Mehrunnisa Iqbal as Zunaisha (Shahroz's friend and ex-fiance)

Production 

Khan was agreed to do the role as he found the character quite interesting, especially the contrasting traits in the character. It marked his second on-screen appearance with Baloch, the first being Noor (2020).

References

External links 

 

2022 Pakistani television series debuts
2022 Pakistani television series endings